Troitskoye is a rural locality (a village) in Voskresenskoye Rural Settlement, Cherepovetsky District, Vologda Oblast, Russia. The population was 3 as of 2002.

Geography 
Troitskoye is located 65 km northeast of Cherepovets (the district's administrative centre) by road. Panteleymonovskoye is the nearest rural locality.

References 

Rural localities in Cherepovetsky District